Oubi Buchraya Bachir (born 1970 in Zouirat, Mauritania)  is the current Sahrawi ambassador to Nigeria, with a base in Abuja. He earned a master's degree in "Conflicts, Peace and Development" at James I University in Castellón de la Plana. He speaks Hassaniya (a variety of Arabic), French and Spanish.

Diplomatic postings 
He started his diplomatic career in 2001, being appointed as the Sahrawi representative for the Netherlands, based in The Hague. In late 2003, he moved to London, as the Sahrawi representative to the United Kingdom and Ireland.

In 2006, he replaced Sadafa Mohamed Bahia as the Sahrawi ambassador to South Africa. In July 2008, he replaced Aliyen Habib Kentaui, presenting this credentials as ambassador to Nigerian President Umaru Musa Yar'Adua. Between 2010 and 2011 he acted first as special envoy and then as non-resident ambassador to Ghana, until the accreditation in late 2011 of Mahayub Sidina, the first Sahrawi resident ambassador in Accra.

References

Sahrawi Sunni Muslims
Living people
1970 births
Polisario Front politicians
University of Paris alumni
Ambassadors of the Sahrawi Arab Democratic Republic to the United Kingdom
Ambassadors of the Sahrawi Arab Democratic Republic to Ireland
Ambassadors of the Sahrawi Arab Democratic Republic to Nigeria
Place of birth missing (living people)
Sahrawi expatriates in France